The Aisin Areions was a professional basketball team that competed in the third division of the Japanese B.League.

Coaches
Shingo Fujimura
Kensaku Tennichi

Roster

Notable players

Marcus Dove
Jordan Faison
Markhuri Sanders-Frison
Shingo Fujimura
Kevin Kotzur
Josh Peppers
Kyle Richardson
Nigel Spikes

Arenas
Anjō City Gymnasium
Anjochiku Kibonooka Gymnasium
Anjo City Sports Center
Echizen City AW-I Sports Arena
Toyohashi City General Gymnasium
Gamagori Citizens Sports Center
Nishio City General Gymnasium
Hekinan City Seaside Gymnasium

Practice facilities
Anjochiku Kibonooka Gymnasium

References

 
Defunct basketball teams in Japan
Sports teams in Aichi Prefecture
1978 establishments in Japan
Basketball teams established in 1978
2022 disestablishments in Japan
Basketball teams disestablished in 2022